Ga is the third consonant of Indic abugidas. In modern Indic scripts, ga is derived from the early "Ashoka" Brahmi letter , which is probably derived from the Aramaic letter  (gimel, /g/) after having gone through the Gupta letter .

Āryabhaṭa numeration

Aryabhata used Devanagari letters for numbers, very similar to the Greek numerals, even after the invention of Indian numerals. The values of the different forms of ग are: 
ग  = 3 (३)
ग  = 300 (३००)
गु  = 30,000 (३० ०००)
गृ  = 3,000,000 (३० ०० ०००)
गॣ  = 3 (३०८)
गे  = 3 (३०१०)
गै  = 3 (३०१२)
गो  = 3 (३०१४)
गौ  = 3 (३०१६)

Historic Ga
There are three different general early historic scripts - Brahmi and its variants, Kharoshthi, and Tocharian, the so-called slanting Brahmi. Ga as found in standard Brahmi,  was a simple geometric shape, with slight variations toward the Gupta . The Tocharian Ga  did not have an alternate Fremdzeichen form. The third form of ga, in Kharoshthi was probably derived from Aramaic separately from the Brahmi letter.

Brahmi Ga
The Brahmi letter , Ga, is probably derived from the Aramaic Gimel , and is thus related to the modern Latin G and C, and the Greek Gamma. Several identifiable styles of writing the Brahmi Ga can be found, most associated with a specific set of inscriptions from an artifact or diverse records from an historic period. As the earliest and most geometric style of Brahmi, the letters found on the Edicts of Ashoka and other records from around that time are normally the reference form for Brahmi letters, with vowel marks not attested until later forms of Brahmi back-formed to match the geometric writing style.

Tocharian Ga
The Tocharian letter  is derived from the Brahmi , but does not have an alternate Fremdzeichen form.

Kharoshthi Ga
The Kharoshthi letter  is generally accepted as being derived from the Aramaic Gimel , and is thus related to G and C, and Gamma, in addition to the Brahmi Ga.

Devanagari script

Ga (ग) is the third consonant of the Devanagari abugida. It ultimately arose from the Brahmi letter , after having gone through the Gupta letter . Letters that derive from it are the Gujarati letter ગ and the Modi letter 𑘐.

Devanagari Gga 
Gga (ॻ) is the character ग with an underbar to represent the voiced velar implosive  that occurs in Sindhi. This underbar is distinct from the Devanagari stress sign anudātta. The underbar is fused to the stem of the letter while the anudātta is a stress accent applied to the entire syllable. This underbar used for Sindhi implosives does not exist as a separate character in Unicode. When the ु or ू vowel sign is applied to jja (ॻ), the ु and ू vowel signs are drawn beneath jja. When the उ ( ु) vowel sign or ऊ ( ू) vowel sign is applied to ja with an anudātta (ग॒), the उ ( ु) vowel sign or ऊ ( ू) vowel sign is first placed under ja (ग) and then the anudātta is placed underneath the उ ( ु) vowel sign or ऊ ( ू) vowel sign.

An example of a Sindhi word that uses gga (ॻ) is ॻुड़ु (ڳُڙُ), which is of the masculine grammatical gender and means jaggery.

Devanagari Ġa 
Ġa (ग़) is the character ग with a single dot underneath. It is used in Devanagari transcriptions of Urdu (غ) and other languages to denote the voiced velar fricative .

Devanagari-using Languages
Like all Indic scripts, Devanagari uses vowel marks attached to the base consonant to override the inherent /ə/ vowel:

Conjuncts with ग

Devanagari exhibits conjunct ligatures, as is common in Indic scripts. In modern Devanagari texts, most conjuncts are formed by reducing the letter shape to fit tightly to the following letter, usually by dropping a character's vertical stem, sometimes referred to as a "half form". Some conjunct clusters are always represented by a true ligature, instead of a shape that can be broken into constituent independent letters. Vertically stacked conjuncts are ubiquitous in older texts, while only a few are still used routinely in modern Devanagari texts. The use of ligatures and vertical conjuncts may vary across languages using the Devanagari script, with Marathi in particular preferring the use of half forms where texts in other languages would show ligatures and vertical stacks.

Ligature conjuncts of ग
True ligatures are quite rare in Indic scripts. The most common ligated conjuncts in Devanagari are in the form of a slight mutation to fit in context or as a consistent variant form appended to the adjacent characters. Those variants include Na and the Repha and Rakar forms of Ra. Nepali and Marathi texts use the "eyelash" Ra half form  for an initial "R" instead of repha.
 Repha र্ (r) + ग (ga) gives the ligature rga: 

 Eyelash र্ (r) + ग (ga) gives the ligature rga:

 ग্ (g) + rakar र (ra) gives the ligature gra:

 ग্ (g) + र্ (r) + य (ya) gives the ligature grya:

 ग্ (g) + न (na) gives the ligature gna:

 ग্ (g) + न্ (n) + य (ya) gives the ligature gnya:

 द্ (d) + ग (ga) gives the ligature dga:

 द্ (d) + ग্ (g) + rakar र (ra) gives the ligature dgra:

Stacked conjuncts of ग
Vertically stacked ligatures are the most common conjunct forms found in Devanagari text. Although the constituent characters may need to be stretched and moved slightly in order to stack neatly, stacked conjuncts can be broken down into recognizable base letters, or a letter and an otherwise standard ligature.
 ब্ (b) + ग (ga) gives the ligature bga:

 छ্ (cʰ) + ग (ga) gives the ligature cʰga:

 ड্ (ḍ) + ग (ga) gives the ligature ḍga:

 ढ্ (ḍʱ) + ग (ga) gives the ligature ḍʱga:

 ग্ (g) + ज (ja) gives the ligature gja:

 ग্ (g) + ज্ (j) + ञ (ña) gives the ligature gjña:

 ग্ (g) + ल (la) gives the ligature gla:

 ङ্ (ŋ) + ग (ga) gives the ligature ŋga:

 Repha र্ (r) + ङ্ (ŋ) + ग (ga) gives the ligature rŋga:

 ट্ (ṭ) + ग (ga) gives the ligature ṭga:

 ठ্ (ṭʰ) + ग (ga) gives the ligature ṭʰga:

 व্ (v) + ग (ga) gives the ligature vga:

Bengali script
The Bengali script গ is derived from Siddhaṃ , and is marked by the lack of horizontal head line, and less geometric shape than its Devanagari counterpart, ग. The inherent vowel of Bengali consonant letters is /ɔ/, so the bare letter গ will sometimes be transliterated as "go" instead of "ga". Adding okar, the "o" vowel mark, gives a reading of /go/.
Like all Indic consonants, গ can be modified by marks to indicate another (or no) vowel than its inherent "a".

গ in Bengali-using languages
গ is used as a basic consonant character in all of the major Bengali script orthographies, including Bengali and Assamese.

Conjuncts with গ
Bengali গ exhibits conjunct ligatures, as is common in Indic scripts, with a tendency towards stacked ligatures.
 দ্ (d) + গ (ga) gives the ligature dga:

 গ্ (g) + ধ (dʱa) gives the ligature gdʱa:

 গ্ (g) + ধ্ (dʱ) + র (ra) gives the ligature gdʱra, with the ra phala suffix:

 গ্ (g) + ধ্ (dʱ) + য (ya) gives the ligature gdʱya, with the ya phala suffix:

 গ্ (g) + ল (la) gives the ligature gla:

 গ্ (g) + ম (ma) gives the ligature gma:

 গ্ (g) + ন (na) gives the ligature gna:

 গ্ (g) + ণ (ṇa) gives the ligature gṇa:

 গ্ (g) + ন্ (n) + য (ya) gives the ligature gnya, with the ya phala suffix:

 গ্ (g) + র (ra) gives the ligature gra, with the ra phala suffix:

 গ্ (g) + র্ (r) + য (ya) gives the ligature grya, with the ra phala and ya phala suffixes

 গ্ (g) + ব (va) gives the ligature gva, with the va phala suffix:

 গ্ (g) + য (ya) gives the ligature gya, with the ya phala suffix:

 ল্ (l) + গ (ga) gives the ligature lga:

 ঙ্ (ŋ) + গ (ga) gives the ligature ŋga:

 ঙ্ (ŋ) + গ্ (g) + য (ya) gives the ligature ŋgya, with the ya phala suffix:

 র্ (r) + গ (ga) gives the ligature rga, with the repha prefix:

 র্ (r) + গ্ (g) + য (ya) gives the ligature rgya, with repha and ya phala affixes:

Gurmukhi script 
Gagaa  (ਗ) is the eighth letter of the Gurmukhi alphabet. Its name is [gəgːɑ] and is pronounced as /g/ when used in words. It is derived from the Laṇḍā letter ga, and ultimately from Brahmi ga. Gurmukhi gagaa does not have a special pairin or addha (reduced) form for making conjuncts, and in modern Punjabi texts do not take a half form or halant to indicate the bare consonant /g/, although Gurmukhi Sanskrit texts may use an explicit halant.

Gujarati Ga

Ga (ગ) is the third consonant of the Gujarati abugida. It is derived from Devanagari Ga , and ultimately the Brahmi letter .

Gujarati-using Languages
The Gujarati script is used to write the Gujarati and Kutchi languages. Like all Indic scripts, Gujarati uses vowel marks attached to the base consonant to override the inherent /ə/ vowel:

Conjuncts with ગ

Gujarati ગ exhibits conjunct ligatures, much like its parent Devanagari Script. Most Gujarati conjuncts can only be formed by reducing the letter shape to fit tightly to the following letter, usually by dropping a character's vertical stem, sometimes referred to as a "half form". A few conjunct clusters can be represented by a true ligature, instead of a shape that can be broken into constituent independent letters, and vertically stacked conjuncts can also be found in Gujarati, although much less commonly than in Devanagari.
True ligatures are quite rare in Indic scripts. The most common ligated conjuncts in Gujarati are in the form of a slight mutation to fit in context or as a consistent variant form appended to the adjacent characters. Those variants include Na and the Repha and Rakar forms of Ra.
 ર્ (r) + ગ (ga) gives the ligature RGa:

 ગ્ (g) + ર (ra) gives the ligature GRa:

 ગ્ (g) + ન (na) gives the ligature GNa:

 દ્ (d) + ગ (ga) gives the ligature DGa:

Telugu Ga

Ga (గ) is a consonant of the Telugu abugida. It ultimately arose from the Brahmi letter . It is closely related to the Kannada letter ಗ. Most Telugu consonants contain a v-shaped headstroke that is related to the horizontal headline found in other Indic scripts, although headstrokes do not connect adjacent letters in Telugu. The headstroke is normally lost when adding vowel matras.
Telugu conjuncts are created by reducing trailing letters to a subjoined form that appears below the initial consonant of the conjunct. Many subjoined forms are created by dropping their headline, with many extending the end of the stroke of the main letter body to form an extended tail reaching up to the right of the preceding consonant. This subjoining of trailing letters to create conjuncts is in contrast to the leading half forms of Devanagari and Bengali letters. Ligature conjuncts are not a feature in Telugu, with the only non-standard construction being an alternate subjoined form of Ṣa (borrowed from Kannada) in the KṢa conjunct.

Malayalam Ga

Ga (ഗ) is a consonant of the Malayalam abugida. It ultimately arose from the Brahmi letter , via the Grantha letter  Ga. Like in other Indic scripts, Malayalam consonants have the inherent vowel "a", and take one of several modifying vowel signs to represent syllables with another vowel or no vowel at all.

Conjuncts of ഗ
As is common in Indic scripts, Malayalam joins letters together to form conjunct consonant clusters. There are several ways in which conjuncts are formed in Malayalam texts: using a post-base form of a trailing consonant placed under the initial consonant of a conjunct, a combined ligature of two or more consonants joined together, a conjoining form that appears as a combining mark on the rest of the conjunct, the use of an explicit candrakkala mark to suppress the inherent "a" vowel, or a special consonant form called a "chillu" letter, representing a bare consonant without the inherent "a" vowel. Texts written with the modern reformed Malayalam orthography, put̪iya lipi, may favor more regular conjunct forms than older texts in paḻaya lipi, due to changes undertaken in the 1970s by the Government of Kerala.
 ഗ് (g) +  ഗ (ga) gives the ligature gga:

 ഗ് (g) +  ഘ (ɡʱa) gives the ligature gɡʱa:

 ഗ് (g) +  ദ (da) gives the ligature gda:

 ഗ് (g) +  ന (na) gives the ligature gna:

 ഗ് (g) +  മ (ma) gives the ligature gma:

 ഗ് (g) +  ര (ra) gives the ligature gra:

Thai script 
Kho khwai (ค) and kho khon (ฅ) are the fourth and fifth letters of the Thai script. They fall under the low class of Thai consonants. In IPA, kho khwai and kho khon are pronounced as [kʰ] at the beginning of a syllable and are pronounced as [k̚] at the end of a syllable. The previous two letters of the alphabet, kho khai (ข) and kho khuat (ฃ), are also named kho, however, they all fall under the high class of Thai consonants. The next letter of the alphabet, kho ra-khang (ฆ), correspond to the Sanskrit letter ‘घ’. Unlike many Indic scripts, Thai consonants do not form conjunct ligatures, and use the pinthu—an explicit virama with a dot shape—to indicate bare consonants.

Kho Khwai 
In the acrophony of the Thai script, khwai (ควาย) means ‘water buffalo’. Kho khwai corresponds to the Sanskrit character ‘ग’.

Kho Khon 
In the acrophony of the Thai script, khon (คน) means ‘person’. Kho khon (ฅ) represents the voiced velar fricative sound /ɣ/ that existed in Old Thai at the time the alphabet was created but no longer exists in Modern Thai. When the Thai script was developed, the voiceless velar fricative sound did not have a Sanskrit or Pali counterpart so the character kho khwai was slightly modified to create kho khon. During the Old Thai period, this sounds merged into the stop /ɡ/, and as a result the use of this letters became unstable. Although kho khon is now obsolete, it remains in dictionaries, preserving the traditional count of 44 letters in the Thai alphabet. When the first Thai typewriter was developed by Edwin Hunter McFarland in 1892, there was simply no space for all characters, thus kho khon was one of the two letters left out along with kho khuat. Although kho khon does not appear in modern Thai orthography, some writers and publishers are trying to reintroduce its usage.

Canadian Aboriginal Syllabics Ke

ᑫ, ᑭ, ᑯ and ᑲ are the base characters "Ke", "Ki", "Ko" and "Ka" in the Canadian Aboriginal Syllabics. The bare consonant ᒃ (K) is a small version of the A-series letter ᑲ, although the Western Cree letter ᐠ, derived from Pitman shorthand was the original bare consonant symbol for K. The character ᑫ is derived from a handwritten form of the Devanagari letter ग, without the headline or vertical stem, and the forms for different vowels are derived by mirroring.
Unlike most writing systems without legacy computer encodings, complex Canadian syllabic letters are represented in Unicode with pre-composed characters, rather than with base characters and diacritical marks.

Odia Ga

Ga (ଗ) is a consonant of the Odia abugida. It ultimately arose from the Brahmi letter , via the Siddhaṃ letter  Ga. Like in other Indic scripts, Odia consonants have the inherent vowel "a", and take one of several modifying vowel signs to represent syllables with another vowel or no vowel at all.

Conjuncts of ଗ 
As is common in Indic scripts, Odia joins letters together to form conjunct consonant clusters. The most common conjunct formation is achieved by using a small subjoined form of trailing consonants. Most consonants' subjoined forms are identical to the full form, just reduced in size, although a few drop the curved headline or have a subjoined form not directly related to the full form of the consonant. The second type of conjunct formation is through pure ligatures, where the constituent consonants are written together in a single graphic form. This ligature may be recognizable as being a combination of two characters or it can have a conjunct ligature unrelated to its constituent characters.
 ଙ୍ (ŋ) +  ଗ (ga) gives the ligature ŋga:

 ର୍ (r) +  ଗ (ga) gives the ligature rga:

 ଗ୍ (g) +  ର (ra) gives the ligature gra:

Khmer Ko

Ko (គ) is a consonant of the Khmer abugida. It ultimately arose from the Brahmi letter , via the Pallava letter  Ga.  Like in other Indic scripts, Khmer consonants have the inherent vowel "a", and take one of several modifying vowel signs to represent syllables with another vowel.  Actually, the sounds of the vowels are modified by the consonant; see the article on the Khmer writing system for details.

Tai Tham Script

Low Ka is a consonant of the Tai Tham abugida. It ultimately arose from the Brahmi letter , via the Pallava letter  Ga.  The Tai Tham script was originally used to write Pali (the name 'Tham' is a local form of dharma), and faced the same limitations in writing Tai languages as Khmer had.  The Thai solutions were adopted, with consonants being systematically modified by the addition of a tail to supply new consonants, mostly for fricatives.  Low Ka was modified, yielding what for convenience we call Low Khha here.  Both consonants are low consonants in the Tai alphabets.  The two sounds, /ɡ/ and /ɣ/, subsequently merɡed in Lao as /kʰ/, and Low Khha is absent from the Lao variant of Tai Tham.  The other Tai languages keep them separate, as /k/ and /x/.

Low Ka
Like in other Indic scripts, Tai Tham consonants have the inherent vowel "a", and take one of several modifying vowel signs to represent syllables with another vowel.

Low Ka can serve as the initial consonant of a stack, and several examples can be seen above.  It can also occur as the final element of a consonant stack in words of Indic origin, both in the cluster gg of a Pali word  magga 'road' and as the final consonant after apocation of the final vowel, e.g.  nāg 'nāga'.

In writing systems that make use of tall aa, as the initial letter of an akshara the letter is followed by tall aa. as shown in the table of matras above.  This is because the sequence of letter and round aa  could formerly be very similar to the independent letter high ka.  This rule is frequently neglected when a mark above would clearly disambiguate the two.

Low Khha
Like in other Indic scripts, Tai Tham consonants have the inherent vowel "a", and take one of several modifying vowel signs to represent syllables with another vowel.

This form occurs only as the initial consonant of a syllable.  This letter combined in aksharas with the dependent vowel Ā uses round aa, as shown in the table of matras above, rather than tall aa.

Comparison of Ga
The various Indic scripts are generally related to each other through adaptation and borrowing, and as such the glyphs for cognate letters, including Ga, are related as well.

Character encodings of Ga
Most Indic scripts are encoded in the Unicode Standard, and as such the letter Ga in those scripts can be represented in plain text with unique codepoint. Ga from several modern-use scripts can also be found in legacy encodings, such as ISCII.

See also
 Gimel

References

 Kurt Elfering: Die Mathematik des Aryabhata I. Text, Übersetzung aus dem Sanskrit und Kommentar. Wilhelm Fink Verlag, München, 1975, 
 Georges Ifrah: The Universal History of Numbers. From Prehistory to the Invention of the Computer. John Wiley & Sons, New York, 2000, .
 B. L. van der Waerden: Erwachende Wissenschaft. Ägyptische, babylonische und griechische Mathematik. Birkhäuser-Verlag, Basel Stuttgart, 1966, 
 
 
 Conjuncts are identified by IAST transliteration, except aspirated consonants are indicated with a superscript "h" to distinguish from an unaspirated cononant + Ha, and the use of the IPA "ŋ" and "ʃ" instead of the less dinstinctive "ṅ" and "ś".

Indic letters